The following is a list of mayors of Lubbock, Texas.

See also
 Mayoral elections in Lubbock
 Timeline of Lubbock, Texas

References

History of City Council Members

Lubbock
 
Lubbock, Texas-related lists